Social phenomena or social phenomenon (singular) are any behaviours, actions, or events that takes place because of social influence, including from contemporary as well as historical societal influences.  They are often a result of multifaceted processes that add ever increasing dimensions as they operate through individual nodes of people. Because of this, social phenomenon are inherently dynamic and operate within a specific time and historical context.

Social phenomena are observable, measurable data.  Psychological notions may drive them, but those notions are not directly observable; only the phenomena that express them.

See also
 Phenomenological sociology
 Sociological imagination

References 

 
Sociological terminology
Social philosophy
Phenomena